The second season of Queen of the Universe is slated to premiere on June 2, 2023, through streaming service Paramount+.

Production 
On February 15, 2022, a press release from Paramount+ announced that the television series was renewed for a second season. Graham Norton has returned as the host of the series with Trixie Mattel, Michelle Visage, and Vanessa Williams returning as judges, except for Leona Lewis, who was replaced by Mel B.

The cast was announced on February 22, 2023, with a total of ten contestants, including Aura Eternal, a runner-up from the second season of Drag Race Italia, and Love Masisi, a contestant from the second season of Drag Race Holland.

Contestants 
Ages, names, and cities stated are at the time of filming.

Notes:

Contestant progress 
Legend:

References 

2023 American television seasons
2023 in LGBT history
Queen of the Universe
Upcoming television seasons